Helam (ḥêlām; meaning "stronghold", or "place of abundance") is a Hebrew Bible place name. According to 2 Samuel 10:15-18, Helam was the site of King David's victory over the Syrians under Hadarezer. It may be associated with modern Alma, Israel,  about 55 km (34 mi) east of the Sea of Galilee.

See also
 Alma, Israel
 Hadadezer bar Rehob
 List of biblical places starting with H

Footnotes

References

 
 

Hebrew Bible places
Archaeological sites in Israel